Jasen Mesić (born June 11, 1972) is a Croatian politician from the Croatian Democratic Union. He served as the Croatian Minister of Culture between 2010 and 2011.

Mesić was born in Zagreb. He graduated in history and archeology at the Faculty of Humanities and Social Sciences of the University of Zagreb in 1996 and later in submarine archeology at Accademia per metodologia e tecnica di archeologia subacquea in Italy. Subsequently, he attained his master's degree at the University of Siena.

Jasen Mesić was the mayoral candidate of Croatian Democratic Union for the 2009 local elections in Zagreb. He received 39,623 votes or 13.17% and was eliminated in the first round.

References

Politicians from Zagreb
Croatian Democratic Union politicians
Culture ministers of Croatia
Faculty of Humanities and Social Sciences, University of Zagreb alumni
University of Siena alumni
1972 births
Living people
Representatives in the modern Croatian Parliament